Zuzanna Anna Radecka-Pakaszewska (born 2 April 1975 in Ruda Śląska) is a retired Polish athlete who specialised in the sprinting events. She represented her country at two Summer Olympics, in 2000 and 2004, as well as three outdoor and two indoor World Championships. Most of her success came in the relay, hr biggest individual achievement being the silver medal at the 1999 Summer Universiade.

Achievements

Personal bests
Outdoor
 100 metres – 11.29 (2000)
 200 metres – 22.96 (1999 & 2000)
 400 metres – 51.58 (2005)
 100 metres hurdles – 13.83 (1998)

Indoor
 60 metres – 7.28 (2000)
 200 metres – 23.36 (1999)
 400 metres – 52.54 (2007)

External links
 

1975 births
Living people
Polish female sprinters
Sportspeople from Ruda Śląska
Athletes (track and field) at the 2000 Summer Olympics
Athletes (track and field) at the 2004 Summer Olympics
Olympic athletes of Poland
European Athletics Championships medalists
Universiade medalists in athletics (track and field)
Universiade silver medalists for Poland
Medalists at the 1999 Summer Universiade
Olympic female sprinters